Six Duets (1982) is an album by American saxophonist and composer Anthony Braxton featuring bassist John Lindberg recorded in Italy in 1982 and released on the Italian Cecma label.

Track listing
All compositions by Anthony Braxton are graphically titled and the following attempts to translate the title to text.

 "R-BOXK-H [Composition No. 69B]" – 5:14
 "BRZX-(TM)-H-28 [Composition No. 69A]" – 8:19
 "H-46M [Composition No. 23J]" – 7:11
 "67M/F-12 [Composition No. 6A]" – 6:36
 "OSH------K---10Q/H/G [Composition No. 69P]" – 3:45
 "S-37C-67B/F7 [Composition No. 52]" – 7:16
 "Four" [take 1] (Miles Davis) – 5:55 Bonus track on CD reissue
 "Four" [take 2] (Davis) – 3:01 Bonus track on CD reissue

Personnel
Anthony Braxton – alto saxophone, E♭ sopranino saxophone, clarinet
John Lindberg – bass

References

Anthony Braxton albums
John Lindberg albums
1982 albums